The district of Tandridge, the easternmost of 11 local government districts in the English county of Surrey, has more than 70 current and former places of worship. Religious buildings dating from every age between the Norman era and the present are found across the area, which is characterised by small towns and ancient hamlets. A range of architectural styles and materials are represented: from "Surrey's only Perpendicular Gothic church of any size or pretension" (at Lingfield) to small weatherboarded buildings, tin tabernacles and modern brick chapels. , 61 places of worship are in use in the district and a further 13 former churches and chapels no longer hold religious services but survive in alternative uses.

Christianity is the majority religion in Tandridge, and the Church of England — the country's Established Church — is represented by the largest number of churches. Several congregations of Roman Catholics, Methodists, Baptists and the United Reformed Church also meet at their own buildings in the main towns and elsewhere; and various other Protestant Nonconformist denominations are accommodated in chapels and meeting rooms of different styles and ages. Jehovah's Witnesses and the Church of Jesus Christ of Latter-day Saints both have large places of worship of regional importance in the district.

English Heritage has awarded listed status to 28 places of worship in the district of Tandridge. A building is defined as "listed" when it is placed on a statutory register of buildings of "special architectural or historic interest" in accordance with the Planning (Listed Buildings and Conservation Areas) Act 1990. The Department for Culture, Media and Sport, a Government department, is responsible for this; English Heritage, a non-departmental public body, acts as an agency of the department to administer the process and advise the department on relevant issues.  There are three grades of listing status: Grade I, the highest, is defined as being of "exceptional interest"; Grade II* is used for "particularly important buildings of more than special interest"; and Grade II, the lowest, is used for buildings of "special interest". As of February 2001, there were 20 buildings with Grade I status, 52 with Grade II* status and 519 with Grade II status in the district.

Overview of the district

Tandridge is the easternmost of the 11 districts in Surrey, an inland county in southeast England immediately south of London. Clockwise from the north, it shares borders with the London boroughs of Croydon and Bromley, the district of Sevenoaks in Kent, the Wealden district in East Sussex, the Mid Sussex district and the borough of Crawley of West Sussex, and the Surrey district of Reigate and Banstead.

The district is largely rural. Caterham is the largest town with 31,000 people, Oxted (which is part of a larger urban area with neighbouring Hurst Green and Limpsfield) has 11,000, and more than half the population lives in the suburbanised northern part of the district which includes these towns and nearby Warlingham, Whyteleafe and Woldingham.  This area is adjacent to the London Borough of Croydon and is part of the Greater London Urban Area. Elsewhere, there are many small villages with ancient origins—many have their own parish church, sometimes supplemented with other places of worship.

Anglican churches with 12th-century or older origins include those at Bletchingley, Burstow, Chelsham, Horne and Nutfield; many have been rebuilt and restored to some extent, but the survival of ancient fabric is common.  Caterham's church of St Lawrence, dating from about 1100 and featuring a "truly remarkable" original window, has been supplemented by two 19th-century churches but remains open for services.  Other Anglican churches were built in the Victorian era and the 20th century as villages and suburbs expanded: examples include St Luke's at Whyteleafe, the second church (St Christopher's) at Warlingham, and the centrally located and much larger St Paul's at Woldingham (1933)—superseding the isolated single-room St Agatha's Church, called "Surrey's meanest chapel" by Pevsner.  Elsewhere, a former school was converted into a church in South Godstone, and at Smallfield a church hall doubles as an Anglican chapel of ease.

Protestant Nonconformity has a long history in the district.  Baptist worship has taken place at Dormansland since 1792, and the church (which occupies a building dating from 1817) helped to found several others in the area—such as those at Lingfield and Smallfield (both now closed).  The isolated Pains Hill Chapel near Limpsfield has existed since 1823, and since World War II Evangelical congregations have developed in Hurst Green and Smallfield.  Meanwhile, the village of Newchapel was chosen as the site of England's first Latter-day Saints' Temple, named the London England Temple.  The main towns have places of worship serving a wider variety of denominations: the Congregational Federation can be found in Caterham, Oxted has an Open Brethren Gospel Hall, and a Christian Science church, and both places support Roman Catholic and United Reformed congregations.  Oxted's Catholic and United Reformed churches are both Grade II-listed: the former, a "quite exceptional building" of the early 20th century, combines the Perpendicular Gothic Revival and Arts and Crafts styles, while the Church of the Peace of God (the United Reformed church) is a 1930s interpretation of the Byzantine style.  The Methodist Statistical Returns published in 1947 recorded chapels of Wesleyan Methodist origin in Bletchingley, Caterham (the "Guards' Church", used by the public and by soldiers at the nearby barracks), Caterham Valley, Lingfield and Warlingham.  Caterham's chapel, registered in 1904, is still in use; Warlingham's was replaced by a new building on the same site in 1961; Lingfield's is now in secular use; and the other two do not survive.  A new Methodist church building was also registered in 1961 in Hurst Green.  Elsewhere, the Plymouth Brethren Christian Church have a meeting room in the former goods yard next to Upper Warlingham railway station in Whyteleafe and another on the borders of Whyteleafe and Caterham.

Religious affiliation
According to the United Kingdom Census 2011, 82,998 people lived in the district of Tandridge.  Of these, 64.87% identified themselves as Christian, 0.74% were Hindu, 0.72% were Muslim, 0.36% were Buddhist, 0.16% were Jewish, 0.07% were Sikh, 0.32% followed another religion, 25.27% claimed no religious affiliation and 7.5% did not state their religion.  The proportion of Christians was much higher than the 59.38% in England as a whole.  Adherents of Islam, Hinduism, Judaism and Sikhism and Buddhism were much less prevalent in the district than in England overall: in 2011, 5.02% of people in England were Muslim, 1.52% were Hindu, 0.79% were Sikh, 0.49% were Jewish and 0.45% were Buddhist.  The proportion of people who followed religions not mentioned in the Census was also lower than the national figure of 0.43%.  The proportion of people with no religious affiliation was slightly higher than the 24.74% recorded at a national level.

Administration

Anglican churches
All of Tandridge district's Anglican churches are administered by the Anglican Diocese of Southwark, the seat of which is Southwark Cathedral in London.  There are three episcopal areas within the diocese, each of which has two archdeaconries; in turn these each cover a number of deaneries.  Caterham Deanery and Godstone Deanery, both of which are in the Reigate Archdeaconry and the Croydon Episcopal Area, cover all the district's churches.  The three churches at Caterham, two each at Warlingham and Woldingham, and those at Chaldon, Chelsham, Farleigh and Whyteleafe, are administered by Caterham Deanery.  Godstone Deanery includes the churches at Bletchingley, Blindley Heath, Burstow, Crowhurst, Dormansland, Felbridge, Godstone, Horne, Hurst Green, Limpsfield, Limpsfield Chart, Lingfield, Nutfield, Outwood, Oxted, South Godstone, South Nutfield, Tandridge and Tatsfield.  The church hall at Smallfield in the parish of Burstow is also used for services and is accordingly part of the Deanery.

Roman Catholic churches
There are Roman Catholic churches at Caterham, Lingfield, Oxted and Warlingham.  They are administered by the Roman Catholic Diocese of Arundel and Brighton, whose cathedral is at Arundel in West Sussex.  Caterham, Oxted and Warlingham are part of the Redhill Deanery, one of 13 deaneries in the diocese, while Lingfield is in Crawley Deanery as it is part of a joint parish with East Grinstead in West Sussex.  The former church at Whyteleafe was also part of Redhill Deanery.  Occasional Catholic Masses were held for many years at the Anglican church in Tatsfield, which was covered by the parish of Oxted and Warlingham, but these had ceased by 2019.

Other denominations
Dormansland Baptist Church is within the Tonbridge Network of the South Eastern Baptist Association, and Godstone Baptist Church is part of that organisation's Gatwick Network.  The three Methodist churches in the district—at Caterham, Hurst Green and Warlingham—are part of the seven-church Purley Methodist Circuit.  The Southern Synod, one of 13 synods of the United Reformed Church in the United Kingdom, administers the United Reformed churches at Caterham and Oxted.  Smallfield Evangelical Church is a member of the Fellowship of Independent Evangelical Churches (FIEC), a pastoral and administrative network of about 500 churches with an evangelical outlook, and of Affinity (formerly the British Evangelical Council), a network of conservative Evangelical congregations throughout Great Britain.  Caterham Community Church, Dormansland Baptist Church, Godstone Baptist Church, King's Church at Oxted, Oakhall Church and Whyteleafe United Free Church maintain links with the Evangelical Alliance.  Caterham Community Church is also part of the Congregational Federation, an association of independent Congregational churches in Great Britain.  The federation came into existence in 1972 when the Congregational Church in England and Wales merged with several other denominations to form the United Reformed Church.  Certain congregations wanted to remain independent of this, and instead joined the Congregational Federation.  As of January 2021 there were 235 churches in the Federation.  Oakhall Church, also in Caterham, is one of 11 churches in the South East region of Partnership UK, a charitable incorporated organisation which acts as a support network for independent and self-governing churches.

Current places of worship

Former places of worship

Former places of worship demolished since 2000

Notes

References

Bibliography

 (Available online in 14 parts; Guide to abbreviations on page 6)

Tandridge District
Tandridge District
Tandridge District
Churches
Lists of buildings and structures in Surrey